The Battle of Giurgiu took place on 27–30 October 1595. It was part of the Long Turkish War (1591/1593–1606), a border conflict between the Christian powers and the Ottoman Empire over Balkan territories.

References

Battles involving the Ottoman Empire
Battle of Giurgiu
Battles involving Wallachia
Battles involving Transylvania
Battles involving Moldavia
Giurgiu
Military history of Romania
History of Muntenia
1595 in the Ottoman Empire
1595 in Europe
Battles of the Long Turkish War
Michael the Brave
History of Giurgiu County